The 2011 Limerick Senior Hurling Championship was the 117th staging of the Limerick Senior Hurling Championship since its establishment by the Limerick County Board.

Kilmallock were the defending champions.

On 2 October 2011, Na Piarsaigh won the championship after a 2-18 to 0-13 defeat of Ahane in the final. It was their first ever championship title.

Results

Final

Championship statistics

Miscellaneous
 Na Piarsaigh win their first senior title.

References

Limerick Senior Hurling Championship
Limerick Senior Hurling Championship